Horama is a genus of tiger moths in the family Erebidae first described by Jacob Hübner in 1819.

Species
Horama diffissa Grote, 1866
Horama grotei Butler, 1876
Horama margarita McCabe, 1992
Horama oedippus (Boisduval, 1870)
Horama panthalon (Fabricius, 1793) – Texas wasp moth
Horama pennipes (Grote, 1866)
Horama plumipes (Drury, 1773)
Horama pretus (Cramer, [1777])
Horama rawlinsi McCabe, 1992
Horama tarsalis Walker, 1856
Horama zapata Dietz & Duckworth, 1976

Former species
Horama clavipes (Boisduval, 1870)

References

 ;  1976: A review of the genus Horama Hübner and reestablishment of the genus Poliopastea Hampson (Lepidoptera: Ctenuchidae). Smithsonian Contributions to Zoology, (215) abstract and pdf
 ;  2010: Annotated check list of the Noctuoidea (Insecta, Lepidoptera) of North America north of Mexico. ZooKeys, 40: 1–239. 
  1992: Caribbean Horama (Lepidoptera: Arctiidae: Ctenuchinae) with new species and notes on mimicry. Proceedings of the Entomological Society of Washington, 94 (2): 243–248. BHL

External links

Euchromiina
Moth genera